The Colony of Aden competed at the 1962 British Empire and Commonwealth Games in Perth, Western Australia, from 22 November to 1 December 1962.

Athletics

Men
Track events

Key
Note–Ranks given for track events are within the athlete's heat only
N/A = Round not applicable for the event

References

Nations at the 1962 British Empire and Commonwealth Games
British Empire and Commonwealth Games
1962 in Asia
1962 in the British Empire